Gregory Lee Brown (January 5, 1957 – September 26, 2020) was a professional American football defensive lineman in the National Football League (NFL) for eight seasons for the Philadelphia Eagles and the Atlanta Falcons.  He played college football at Eastern Illinois University.

References

1957 births
2020 deaths
Players of American football from Washington, D.C.
American football defensive tackles
American football defensive ends
Eastern Illinois Panthers football players
Philadelphia Eagles players
Atlanta Falcons players
H. D. Woodson High School alumni